The 2005 World Interuniversity Games were the seventh edition of the Games (organised by IFIUS), and were held in Rotterdam, the Netherlands, from October 10 to October 14, 2005.

Hosting
Rotterdam, the Netherlands, was selected as host city for the Games. The host university was INHOLLAND University College. Erasmus University and Hogeschool Rotterdam acted as a co-hosts.

Competitions
Teams participated in four different competitions (three sports), this included the new addition of the Basketball Men competition.

 Football Men
 Football Women
 Futsal Men
 Basketball Men

Final standings

Football Men

Football Women

Futsal Men

Basketball Men

External links
 Homepage IFIUS

World Interuniversity Games
World Interuniversity Games
World Interuniversity Games
International sports competitions hosted by the Netherlands
Multi-sport events in the Netherlands
Sports competitions in Rotterdam
October 2005 sports events in Europe
21st century in Rotterdam